Sussex Airport  is a mile southwest of Sussex in Wantage Township, Sussex County, New Jersey. It is just outside Sussex Borough. The public-use airport is privately owned by Sussex Aviation LLC which purchased it in 2015.

The airport used to host the Sussex Airshow but the previous owner had stopped holding the shows (as of 2009) while he tried to sell the airport. The township of Wantage was then studying the feasibility of purchasing the airport.

Most U.S. airports use the same three-letter location identifier for the FAA and IATA, but this airport is FWN to the FAA and has no IATA code.

Facilities 
Its one runway, 3/21, is 3,506 by 75 feet (1,066 x 23 m). In the year ending May 1, 2019 the airport had 21,444 general aviation aircraft operations, average 59 per day. 29 aircraft were then based at the airport: 86% single-engine, and 14% multi-engine.

The airport does not have air traffic control (ATC), instead using UNICOM where pilots talk on common radio frequencies to coordinate runway and taxiway use.

Runway information
Rwy 3 threshold displaced 
Rwy 21 threshold displaced 
RNAV (GPS) Rwy 3 approach published
VOR-A approach published

On field
Fuel: 100LL, Jet-A
Major frame service
Major powerplant service
Skydiving school
Parking
Tie-downs
Hangars
Airport diner

Off field
Several small diner restaurants in the borough and surrounding Wantage Township, one directly adjacent to the airfield
Sussex Inn, 9 Main St, Sussex, NJ – 1 mi
Shopping and other activities (including Mountain Creek Ski Resort/Waterpark) within  of airport

Embezzlement of federal funds by former airport owner
In 2009, the airport's former owner, Paul Styger, pleaded guilty to federal charges of embezzlement. This stemmed from his misuse of $378,000 of grant money provided for airport improvements. He faced up to two years in prison. He was eventually convicted, and was ordered to repay the money and was put on probation without getting any prison sentence. Wantage Township officials admittedly knew that Styger was under investigation for embezzlement, but were asked to keep silent by state and federal agencies in an attempt to preserve the integrity of the investigation.

References

External links 
 Aerial photo as of 9 March 1991 from USGS The National Map via MSR Maps
 

Airshow Performers 1992–2004
Video: Daniel Héligoin's Snap Roll on Takeoff – 1987 Airshow
Video: Daniel Héligoin's Snap Roll on Takeoff – 1987 Airshow – Slow Motion
The French Connection Airshow at Sussex
Video: Craig Hosking's Upside-down Landing & Takeoff – 1987 Airshow
"Formation Flight" poem by Michelle Chaudoin (father Jim was stationed at Sussex)

Airports in New Jersey
Transportation buildings and structures in Sussex County, New Jersey
Wantage Township, New Jersey